Rudolph T van Vuuren (1908 - date of death unknown), was a South African international lawn bowler.

Bowls career
He won a silver medal in the pairs at the 1958 British Empire and Commonwealth Games in Cardiff, with John Myrdal.

Personal life
He was a Company Manager by trade.

References

1908 births
Date of death unknown
Bowls players at the 1958 British Empire and Commonwealth Games
South African male bowls players
Commonwealth Games silver medallists for South Africa
Commonwealth Games medallists in lawn bowls
Medallists at the 1958 British Empire and Commonwealth Games